A.E. Kalampaki F.C. is a Greek football club, based in Kalampaki, Drama, Greece.

Honors

Domestic Titles and honors

 Drama FCA champion: 4
 1993–94, 2004–05, 2008–09, 2017-18
 Drama FCA Cup Winners : 2
 1992–93, 2017-18

References

Football clubs in Eastern Macedonia and Thrace
Drama
Association football clubs established in 1947
1947 establishments in Greece
Gamma Ethniki clubs